Elections were held on 5 December 1964 to elect members to half of the 60 seats in the Australian Senate. There was no accompanying election to the House of Representatives, as Robert Menzies had called an early House-only election the previous year. As with the previous Senate election, the Coalition held exactly half of the seats in the chamber; the Democratic Labor Party and independent senator Reg Turnbull held the balance of power.

Notes
In New South Wales and Queensland, the coalition parties ran a joint ticket. Of the five senators elected on a joint ticket, three were members of the Liberal Party and two were members of the Country Party. In Western Australia, the coalition parties ran on separate tickets. In South Australia, Tasmania, and Victoria, only the Liberal Party ran a ticket.
The sole independent was Reg Turnbull of Tasmania; he did not face re-election in 1964.

See also
 Candidates of the 1964 Australian Senate election
 Members of the Australian Senate, 1965–1968

References

University of WA  election results in Australia since 1890

1964 elections in Australia
December 1964 events in Australia
Australian Senate elections